Assadissa, is a Moroccan public television channel dedicated to religious affairs. It is a part of the state-owned SNRT Group along with Al Aoula, Arryadia, Athaqafia, Al Maghribia, Aflam TV, Tamazight TV and Laayoune TV. The channel was launched on 3 November 2005.
Other than readings from the Quran, there are also programmes of religious services, debates, and documentaries.

It broadcasts every day from 2:00-23:00. On Saturdays, it is 6:00-21:00.

References

External links

Assadissa at LyngSat Address

Television stations in Morocco
Islamic television networks
Television channels and stations established in 2005
2005 establishments in Morocco
Société Nationale de Radiodiffusion et de Télévision